WFBB-LP (97.5 FM) is a radio station licensed to Glen St Mary, Florida, United States.  The station is currently owned by First Baptist Church.

References

External links
 

FBB-LP
Baker County, Florida
FBB-LP